Moudania (Moudaniá) is a former municipality in Chalkidiki, Greece, named after Mudanya in present Turkey. Since the 2011 local government reform it is part of the municipality Nea Propontida, of which it is a municipal unit. The municipal unit has an area of 141.464 km2. Population 19,067 (2011). The seat of the municipality was in Nea Moudania. The area is a popular tourist resort for people from Thessaloniki.

Subdivisions
The municipal unit Moudania is subdivided into the following communities:
Nea Moudania
Agios Mamas
Agios Panteleimonas
Dionysiou
Zografou
Nea Poteidaia
Portaria
Simantra
Flogita

Population

References 

Populated places in Chalkidiki
Former municipalities of Greece